Rz was an electric locomotive built by ASEA to test out asynchronous motors. It was built in 1982 and closely related to the Rc-series. It was test run until 1989 on Siljansbanan, but there was never any mass production of it.

Later developments
After ASEA merged with Brown, Boveri & Cie to form Asea Brown Boveri in 1988 the development of asynchronous motors was moved to Switzerland. The Rz technology was utilized for the development of the X2-train and the Rc5-locomotive.

Disposal
In 1992 the engine was donated to the Swedish Railway Museum, but they were not particularly interested in it and in 1999 it was moved to Örebro to become a parts locomotive.

References

ASEA locomotives
Bo′Bo′ locomotives
15 kV AC locomotives
Individual locomotives of Sweden